Ponca State Park is a public recreation area located on the banks of the Missouri River  north of Ponca, Nebraska, in the northeastern corner of the state. The park is managed by the Nebraska Game and Parks Commission.

History
The park was created in 1934 when  of land were donated under the sponsorship of Ponca Legion Post 117. In 1934, the Civilian Conservation Corps began developing the site. The park and town bear the name of the Ponca tribe, who inhabited the area before European settlement, and whose chief, Standing Bear, won a celebrated court battle to have the Indian declared a "person" under U.S. law.

Natural history
The park is noted for its biodiversity. Eastern woodland flowers such as bloodroot, Canada violet, phlox and sweet cicely can be found growing among prairie plants, including yucca, clover, and larkspur. The wild plum and gooseberry thickets were also noted by the Lewis and Clark Expedition, who passed these bluffs with their Corps of Discovery in the summer of 1804. Forested ravines and hillsides contain bur oak, basswood, elm, black walnut and hackberry. White-tailed deer and wild turkey are commonly seen. Coyotes, red and gray foxes, raccoons and bobcats might also be spotted. This area is also known for the concentrations of waterfowl that congregate during the spring and fall migrations. The barred owl is a vocal resident, and wintering bald eagles are often sighted.

Activities and amenities
Twenty-two miles of hiking and biking trails wind through the deep ravines and hilltop ridges of the park. The Three State Overlook offers a scenic blufftop view of Nebraska, Iowa, and South Dakota. An interactive museum at park headquarters includes exhibits about the Missouri River and its history. The park offers a fishing pond, swimming pool, campgrounds, and cabins.

References

External links
Ponca State Park Nebraska Game and Parks Commission
Ponca State Park Map Nebraska Game and Parks Commission

State parks of Nebraska
Protected areas of Dixon County, Nebraska
Missouri River
Protected areas established in 1934
1934 establishments in Nebraska
Museums in Dixon County, Nebraska
Civilian Conservation Corps in Nebraska
Tourist attractions in Dixon County, Nebraska